Anapamea is a genus of moths of the family Noctuidae.

Species include:
 Anapamea cuneatoides Poole, 1989

References
Natural History Museum Lepidoptera genus database

Hadeninae
Noctuoidea genera